Camelford Rural District was a local government division of north Cornwall between 1894 and 1974. The district council offices were at Camelford, Cornwall, England, UK, latterly in the former grammar school. It was one of several rural districts in Cornwall which carried out some local government functions while those for Cornwall as a whole were the responsibility of the Cornwall County Council.

Parishes
The following civil parishes were within the district:
Camelford (Lanteglos by Camelford; Advent)
Davidstow
Forrabury and Minster (Forrabury; Minster)
Lesnewth
Michaelstow
Otterham
St Breward
St Clether
St Juliot
St Teath (St Teath; Delabole)
Tintagel
Trevalga

Sources

Camelford Rural District in Vision of Britain (based on F. Youngs, Local Administrative Units: Southern England. London: Royal Historical Society; p. 63)

History of Cornwall
Rural districts of England
Districts of England created by the Local Government Act 1894
Districts of England abolished by the Local Government Act 1972
Local government in Cornwall
Camelford